This is a list of hills on the Isle of Wight. Many of these hills are important historical, archaeological and nature conservation sites, as well as popular hiking and tourist destinations on the Isle of Wight in southern England.

Colour key

The table is colour-coded based on the classification or "listing" of the hill. The types that occur on the Isle of Wight are Marilyns, HuMPs and TuMPs, listings based on topographical prominence. "Prominence" correlates strongly with the subjective significance of a summit. Peaks with low prominences are either subsidiary tops of a higher summit or relatively insignificant independent summits. Peaks with high prominences tend to be the highest points around and likely to have extraordinary views. A Marilyn is a hill with a prominence of at least 150 metres or about 500 feet. A "HuMP" (the acronym comes from "Hundred Metre Prominence) is a hill with a prominence of at least 100 but less than 150 metres. In this table Marilyns are in beige and HuMPs in lilac. A "TuMP" as defined here is a hill with a prominence of at least 30 but less than 100 metres. The term "sub-Marilyn" or "sub-HuMP" is used, e.g. in the online Database of British and Irish Hills to indicate hills that fall just below the threshold. To qualify for inclusion, hills must either be 100 metres or higher with a prominence of at least 30 metres, below 100 metres they must be in some way notable. For further information see the Lists of mountains and hills in the British Isles and the individual articles on Marilyns, HuMPs, and TuMPs. In this context, "TuMP" is used to connote a hill with a prominence of at least 30 but less than 100 metres. By way of contrast, see also the article listing Tumps (a traditional term meaning a hillock, mound, barrow or tumulus).

List of hills

See also 
 List of mountains and hills of the United Kingdom
 List of Marilyns in England

References and footnotes 

 
Isle of Wight
Hills